Chintamani is a Taluk Headquarters in the Indian state of Karnataka. Located on the Deccan Plateau in the south-eastern part of Karnataka. Chintamani is one of the well planned and developed Towns in the District of Kolar (before splitting) and presently Chikkaballapur. Chintamani is known for its silk and tomato production and their largest markets in Karnataka.

Etymology
Word Chintamani refers to a precious stone or gem that's been documented since centuries in the Hindu Scriptures and Literature. However the naming of the town as 'Chintamani' doesn't have any relevance or relation with this gem. It's said that the town is named after a Maratha chieftain Chintamani Rao.

History

Before 19th Century
The Town of Chintamani along with the District of Kolar has been part of the continuous rule of numerous kingdoms and rulers that include Cholas, Vijayanagar Empire, Gangas, Mysore Wodeyars, Palegaras, Tippu Sultan, British and many local chieftains. This area during the 12th Century was under the rule of Kōpparakēsarivarman Vikrama Chola of the Chola dynasty.

During the reign of British, the Town was called by name CHINTOMNIPETT. The document A Gazetteer of the Territories Under The Government of India on document page no. 204 reads...

CHINTOMNIPETT in British accent could have been CHINTAMANIPETE (ಚಿಂತಾಮಣಿ ಪೇಟೆ), in local Indian accent.

However, as per the known history, the Maratha Chieftain Chintamani Rao was last in line to rule the locality of Chintamani. It's said that the Town has been named after the Chieftain. Part from this nothing much is known either about this person or his achievements.

There are a few buildings and monuments available which stand as an evidence of the history of the place. There is no valid information available about these. Some of them include -

The Fort like construction and watch tower on Anjanadri Hill
Forts on the hill tops at Ambajidurga and Kaiwara and other villages nearby
Inscription at Vasavi Kanyakaparameshwari Temple on Ganigara Veedhi
Architecture and Construction features of some temples – Naganatheshwara Temple, Vasavi Kanyaparameshwari Temple
The old temple at Alambagiri and writings found there.
Street Lamps at Azad Chowk belonging to the time of British (Currently only one of them can be seen in front of Hurigadale Shop)
The Chintamani Cooperative Society Building on Double Road built around 1930's built during British
The Drinking Water Fountain at Bangalore Circle in front of the Guru Bhavana
Kalyanis at Ramakunte and near Railway Station
Some identification names in use. Example : The name Ambhajidurga. Ambhaji is a Maratha name while durga is a common Kannada word used for hills as-in Chitradurga.

Below are a list of some citations that are available in some literature and research documents.

from the Textiles and weavers in medieval South India by Vijaya Ramaswamy. Its to be noted that Chintamani shares the border with Andhra Pradesh.

Post 19th Century
Most of the temples currently seen and being offered worship, have been built mostly during the 19th Century. List below are the few monuments that narrate the history of the place.

 Sri Hari Hareshwara Temple, Azad Chowk – This temple was built around the 19th century by Sri Karupakula Subbarayappa. The temple later received restoration and alteration works by the family members. The temple spans over an area of around 25000 square feet (160 ft x 150 ft). The temple is surrounded by a commercial complex on its East Side, while the other sides are bounded by a high wall. Within the temple complex are the temples dedicated to the Hindu deities Lord Shiva, Lord Vishnu. Most of the Sabarimala Trips originate at this temple by offering the various rituals and attaining the pence (diksha).

Geography

Geographical Location
Chintamani lies in the southeast of the South Indian state of Karnataka.

Chintamani was originally a part of Kolar District since the Formation of State of Karnataka in 1950 until on 23 August 2007, when the Government of Karnataka carved out the new district of Chikkaballapur from the old Kolar district. Chintamani was then included into the new district of Chikkaballapur. Chintamani is one among the 6 Taluks of Chikkaballapur District. The Taluk Headquarters which is Chintamani Town is 36 km from the District Headquarters Chikkaballapur and about 74 km from State Capital Karnataka. The Taluk is bound by Sidlaghatta on West, Bagepalli on North-West, Kolar on South-West, Srinivaspur on South-East and Anantapur district of Andhra Pradesh on East.

Span
The Taluk covers an area of 892  km2; the Town or the Chintamani Hobbli constitutes 15.208 km2 (5.872 mi2) of the total area.

Climate and Rainfall

Chintamani falls in the Tropical Semi-Arid (Steppe) Type of climatic region of India. The climate here is moderately hot and dry. The months of March to May of the summer season are very hot with temperatures of around 38 °C. The region receives very less rainfall of about 40 to 75 cm annually. The area receives rainfall during both South West Monsoon and North East Monsoon Season.

Soil

Taluk mostly consists of Clayey-Loam Soil. This soil has moisture-retention capacity and allows deep furrowing and is suitable for cultivation of cereals, vegetable and pulses.

Rivers
The Taluk doesn't have any perennial rivers. River Papagni has got its catchment basin on the hills of Ambajidurga. The basin over the years has got completed ruined with no vegetation and with soil erosion. Recently, under NREGA guidelines about 73,111 plants are planted and being nurtured to improve the conditions at the catchment basin and inflow of the once river.

Water Resources
Chintamani has a few large lakes that take care of the Town's thirst for water. Kanampalli Lake is the main water reservoir for the Town. Besides other lakes include – Ambajidurga Lake, Gopasandra Lake, Malapalli Lake, Nekkundipete Lake. Under the 100 Crore Grant Scheme, these lakes are being rejuvenated and storage is being upgraded with modern facilities.

Civic Administration
The Taluk falls under Bangalore Division and Chikkaballapur Sub-Division. The Taluk consists of 6 hobblies – Chintamani, Ambajidurga, Kaivara, Muragamalla, Munganahalli and Chilakalanerpu. Of these, Chintamani Hobbli forms the Chintamani Town. The 6 hobblies together have around 339 villages.

The Taluk Administration lies with the Taluk Panchayat, which will be in-charge of the implementation and progress of the developmental activities and schemes. Executive Officer, Taluk Panchayat looks after the administration. Who in turn chief executive officer, Zilla Panchayat.

The Chintamani Municipality was constituted on 28 November 1938. In the year 1995, it was reconstituted to form City Municipal Council. The City Council currently contains 31 wards each represented by a Councillor.

Ward List
, Abbagundu, Anjani Extension, Bamboo Bazaar, Chowda reddy Palya, Halepete, Huvina Pete, JJ Colony, Kanampalli, Kolar Cross, Kolar Road, KR Extension, Malapalli, Mehaboob Nagar, Narashimha Pete, Nekundhipete, NNT Temple Behind, NR Extension, Patalamma Temple Road, Shanti Nagar, Shri Rama Nagar, Sri Rama Nagar, Sonashetty Halli, Tank Bund Road, Tank Bund Road East, Thimmasandra, Tippu Nagar, Venkatagiri Kote 1, Venkatagiri Kote 2, Venkatagiri Kote 3, Venkateshwara Extension, Vinoba Colony.

Economy
The economy is agriculture based. Chintamani is famous for its succulent Tomatoes, Groundnuts, Mangoes, Bananas and Silk Production. Chintamani is also famous for snacks such as chakli, nippat, groundnuts and others. The Chintamani Tomato Market is one of the biggest in Karnataka. It is also famous for some drinks like nannari. Chintamani plays its role even in the production and export of Agarbatti. It is also famous for its silk industry and dairy milk farms and it is also famous for onions.

Transport

Bus Service

 The Town fall under the KSRTC wing of the State Transport Department. Chintamani has an excellent and state of the art KSRTC Bus Service. Since few decades there has been a large Bus Depot and Bus Terminus in the town, well located, maintained and periodically upgraded/developed by the authorities. All the routes operational from the town have a computerized ticketing system in place since last few years. Proposals for the GPS Tracking are under consideration and due implementation shortly. Additional to that private buses have added to the efficiency of road transport in Chintamani.

The town is catered mostly through the Suvarna Karnataka Sarige type of KSRTC Buses. The mostly catered route outside the district is Chintamani – Bangalore. Apart from this there are a numerous routes that cater to many of the important Towns & Cities around that include – Mysore, Chitradurga, Shimoga, Tirupati, Hindupur, Gowribidanur etc. There are number of routes that connect the town with the adjacent town of the Chikkaballapur and Kolar Districts.

The KSRTC has provided its employees with a Residential Quarters and required amenities at a prominent location in the town. As well the Town has one of the main depots in the region.

In the recent years, there has been a greater involvement by the authorities in the up gradation of the Transport Facilities. As part of this, the main Bus Terminus on the Chelur Road has been modified in phase manners to include – RCC Flooring, Improved Bus Shelters, Public Toilets, Commercial Shops, Signage and Information Systems. As well there have been Bus Stops constructed at every village and town on the route between Chintamani – Bangalore as part of this project. And local bus service is in its way of implementation with the goal to cater the local villages and nearby places of importance on the lines of BMTC

Apart from State Transport Corporation, the area has a number of private players, who cover many of the routes as well along with some of those that are not covered by the KSRTC.

The KSRTC Bus Depot is located on the Bangalore Road and that of the Bus Terminus near the Chelur Circle. The KSRTC Residential Quarters are located adjacent to the KSRTC Bus Depot.

Railways

The Chintamani Railway Station which was once a busy terminal, before the advent of Bus Service, had been neglected during the course of time and the services were completely halted since last few decades.

Recently after due proposals and requests from general public, the Railway Authorities, decided to restart the service and the repair of the existing tracks and stations were taken up.  Very soon, the Railways ordered the up gradation of the Narrow Gauge to Broad Gauge and the entire work soon took a sharp swing.

By 2013 November, the New Station at the Chintamani Town were in final stages of completion, whereas the track work between Chintamani-Srinivaspur was under testing. The services were started in the month of November 2013.

The Chintamani Station is abbreviated as CMY on the Railway Station Index.
The Train Services is called Demu with six coaches being operational.

The Train Timings: Train will departure from Bangalore City Railway Station at 8.30 AM and reach Chintamani via Chickballapur and Shidlaghatta en route to Kolar by 12.00 Noon. In the reverse trip the train departs from Kolar by 2.00 Pm. and comes to Chintamani by 2.40 PM. Departs by 2.45 PM and reaches Bangalore City Railway Station by 5.30PM.

However, there is a demand that one more train should be introduced in this route with early morning departure from Kolar around 6 AM and come to Chintamani around 7 AM and reaches Bangalore city around 9.30 AM which will definitely feed thousands of commuters from Chintamani to Bangalore travelling daily for various purposes

Airways

The town doesn't have any airports or helipads at present.  The nearest airport is the Bengaluru International Airport, Devanahalli, 62 km away.

Demographics

Culture

Since the place is surrounded by 2 different states, the culture here is majorly Kannada influenced by Telugu (Rayalaseema) culture. chinthamani is also famous for the evening snacks, specially roasted pea nuts, variety of sweets.

Education

As per the latest reports of the Department of Public Instruction of Karnataka, the [Chintamani Taluk|Taluk of Chintamani] a total of 420 registered schools, of which 222 are Lower Primary Schools and rest 198 are Higher Primary Schools. This list is inclusive of all the schools run by Education Department, Social Welfare Boards, Local Bodies, Aided, Un Aided, Central, Others.

Below is the list of schools located in the City of Chintamani

Religious Tourism
Kaivara kshetra, South Westerly 
Kailasagiri and Ambaji Durga cave temple, South Westerly
Lakshmi Venkataramana temple, Alamgiri, Southerly
Murugamulla: Fakhi Shah Wali Dargah and Muktheshwara swami temple, Easterly
Lakshmi Venkateshwara Temple, Konakuntlu.
Sri Vasavi Temple, doddapet Chintamani (biggest vasavi temple in karnataka)

See also
Dharmavarahalli

References 

Cities and towns in Chikkaballapur district